Botlikh or Botlix may refer to:
Botlikh people, one of the people of the Republic of Dagestan, Russia
Botlikh language, spoken by the Botlikh people
Botlikh (rural locality), a rural locality (selo) in the Republic of Dagestan, Russia